The Baloch Students Organization-Awami or BSO-Awami was founded in 1972, when it split from the Baloch Students Organization (BSO). It supported Baluch People's Liberation Front, a militant organization in Balochistan against Pakistani control. The organisation was Marxist-Leninist in its ideology. It was against the sardari system in Balochistan.

Taj Baloch was the first chairman. He is currently in the government service. Abdul Nabi Bangulzai, a guerilla leader, was the second chairman. The third chairman was Mulla Baksh Dasthi. He was killed by unknown gunmen in 2011.

BNSO, (Baloch National Students Organization) is led by AasKaan Baloch.

References

Further reading
 Adnan Amir, Resistance and Splits Mark the Story of BSO, Viewpoint, 19 June 2014.
 Albert J. Jongman, Alex Peter Schmid, Political Terrorism: A New Guide to Actors, Authors, Concepts, Data Bases, Theories, & Literature, 

Baloch nationalist militant groups
Baloch Students Organization